Abdo Baker Barnawi is a Saudi Arabian footballer. He plays as a defender .

He started his career at Al-Faisaly Club before joining Al-Nasr in the summer of 2007.

References
kooora.com - Arabic

External links

Profile at slstat.com

Saudi Arabian footballers
Al-Faisaly FC players
Al Nassr FC players
Al-Fateh SC players
Al-Tai FC players
Al-Nahda Club (Saudi Arabia) players
Jeddah Club players
Al-Riyadh SC players
Al-Entesar Club players
Living people
1984 births
Saudi First Division League players
Saudi Professional League players
Sportspeople from Jeddah
Saudi Second Division players
Saudi Fourth Division players
Association football defenders